The 2012 Little League Softball World Series was held in Portland, Oregon from August 8 to August 14, 2012.  Six teams from the United States and four from throughout the world competed for the Little League Softball World Champions.

Teams
Each team that competes in the tournament will come out of one of the 10 regions.

Standings

Results

Elimination round

References

 

Little League Softball World Series
Little League Softball World Series
2012 in sports in Oregon
Softball in Oregon